Zudan (also Romanized as Zūdān) is a village in Garkan Rural District, Garkan-e Jonubi District, Mobarakeh County, Isfahan Province, Iran. At the 2006 census, its population was 1,063, in 276 families.

References 

Populated places in Mobarakeh County